Foshtom (alsoRomanizedd as Fashtam and Feshtam; also known as Fasham and Foshtām) is a village in Luleman Rural District, Kuchesfahan District, Rasht County, Gilan Province, Iran. At the 2006 census, its population was 2,076, in 629 families.

References 

Populated places in Rasht County